The following is a list of India's official representatives and their placements at the Big Four international beauty pageants, considered the most important in the world. The country has won a total of ten victories with seventy-seven placements in all four pageants:

 Three – Miss Universe crowns (1994 • 2000  • 2021)
 Six – Miss World crowns (1966 • 1994 • 1997 • 1999 • 2000 • 2017)
 One – Miss Earth crown (2010)

The representatives to these pageants are chosen from the pageants Miss Diva (Miss Universe), Femina Miss India (Miss World), Glamanand Supermodel India (Miss International) and, Miss Divine Beauty (Miss Earth) respectively.

India's Big Four titleholders
India won its first Big Four title when Reita Faria from India bagged the Miss World 1966 title, becoming the first Asian to win Miss World. In 1994, Sushmita Sen won Miss Universe 1994, becoming the country's first ever Miss Universe titleholder. Later that year, Aishwarya Rai added to the winning streak, picking up the Miss World 1994 title, making India the last country to ever win at both Miss Universe and Miss World in the same year in the 20th century.

Diana Hayden then won the Miss World 1997. Actor and model Yukta Mookhey was later crowned Miss World 1999. Six years after Sushmita Sen and Aishwarya Rai's double wins, Lara Dutta for Miss Universe 2000 and Priyanka Chopra for Miss World 2000 replicated the feat in 2000, marking the most recent time (as of ) that any country has won back-to-back at Miss World and, to date, the only time that any country won Miss Universe and Miss World in the same year in the 21st century. India's appearances at the Miss Universe semifinals from 1992 to 2002 made it the first country in the Eastern Hemisphere to place annually at the pageant for at least 10 consecutive years.

In 2010, Nicole Faria from Bangalore became the first Indian woman to win the Miss Earth 2010 pageant. Manushi Chhillar won the Miss World 2017 title and became the sixth Indian woman to be crowned Miss World.

Colour Key

× Did not compete
↑ No pageant held

Hostings

List of crossovers
Crossover winners of a national pageant wins in another major national pageant and then participate in the line of international beauty pageants.

 Iona Pinto – Delegate of India by winning Miss India in 1960. She then participated in Miss International 1960, where she was the first-runner up. Her country sent her again for Miss World 1960 where she was one of the eighteen semifinalists.
 Preeti Mankotia – Delegate of India by winning Miss India in 1991. She then participated in Miss International 1991, where she was one of the fifteen finalist. She again participated in Femina Miss India 1995 where she was crowned as Miss India World and participated in Miss World 1995 where she was unable to place.

See also
I Am She–Miss Universe India, a former pageant in India that sent its winner to Miss Universe from 2010 and 2012
 Bharat Sundari, a former pageant in India that sent its winner to Miss World from 1968 to 1975.

References

External links
 Femina Miss India official website 

Nations at beauty pageants